Ipecac is the third studio album by the experimental rock composer Zoogz Rift, released in 1984 by Snout Records.

Track listing

Personnel 
Adapted from the Ipecac liner notes.
 Zoogz Rift – vocals, guitar, Casio VL-1 synthesizer, güiro, arrangement, production
Musicians
 Danny Buchanan – fretless bass, slide bass guitar
 Scott Colby – Dobro guitar (B1)
 M.B. Gordy – drums, tabla, bells
 Richie Hass – marimba, vibraphone, synthesizer
 Matt Karlsen – spoken word (A3)
 Marc Mylar – tenor saxophone, soprano saxophone, synthesizer, flute, engineering
 Jonathan "Mako" Sharkey – synthesizer

Release history

References

External links 
 Ipecac at iTunes
 

1984 albums
SST Records albums
Zoogz Rift albums